This incomplete list covers the ever-expanding field of video production, and the companies which produce video products, whether for private or commercial purposes. It includes both well-known companies as well as smaller, local companies that have made notable contributions to the field of video production.

Video production companies

 APV (Asia Pacific Vision)
 Seven Arts Pictures.
 MRB Productions
 Creative COW
 Northern Upstart Ltd
 Arnait Video Productions
 HGV Video Productions
 Isuma
 Reeltime Pictures
 Canyon Productions
 Through a Glass Productions
 Tongal
 Sahelis Productions
 MAA Productions
 Filament Productions
 Ragtag Productions
 Once Films

See also

 Video production
 List of video artists

 :Category:Television production companies of the United States
 :Category:Film production companies of the United States
 :Category:Mass media companies of the United States

External links

Video production companies
Video